Aplastodiscus ehrhardti is a species of frog in the family Hylidae.
It is endemic to Brazil. Its natural habitats are subtropical or tropical moist lowland forests and intermittent freshwater marshes.
It is threatened by habitat loss; however, despite this, it remains in the "Least Concern" category "in view of its relatively wide distribution, presumed large population, and because it is unlikely to be declining fast enough to qualify for listing in a more threatened category".

References

Aplastodiscus
Endemic fauna of Brazil
Amphibians described in 1924
Taxonomy articles created by Polbot